The Barrow Steam Navigation Company was a steamship company, owned by the Midland Railway, Furness Railway, and James Little & Company. It was acquired by the Midland Railway in 1907.

It operated a number of ships, including:
 
 PS Duchess of Buccleuch (1888)
 
 PS Manx Queen (1880)

References

 
Defunct shipping companies of the United Kingdom
1907 disestablishments